The 4th constituency of the Seine-Maritime (French: Quatrième circonscription de la Seine-Maritime) is a French legislative constituency in the Seine-Maritime département. Like the other 576 French constituencies, it elects one MP using the two-round system, with a run-off if no candidate receives over 50% of the vote in the first round.

Description
The 4th Constituency of the Seine-Maritime covers some southern suburbs of Rouen the largest of which being Le Grand-Quevilly. The seat also includes the town of Elbeuf which is separated from the city by the now much reduced ancient Forest of Rouvray.

Between its creation in its current form in 1988 until 2017 the seat was a bastion of the centre left Socialist Party. It returned former Prime Minister, President of the National Assembly and Foreign Minister Laurent Fabius at every election between 1988 and 2007.

At the 2017 election the PS incumbent Guillaume Bachelay trailed in third place behind both the La République En Marche! and National Front candidates.

Assembly Members

Election results

2022

 
 
 
 
 
 
 
|-
| colspan="8" bgcolor="#E9E9E9"|
|-
 
 

 
 
 
 
 

* PS dissident

2017

 
 
 
 
 
 
 
|-
| colspan="8" bgcolor="#E9E9E9"|
|-

2012

 
 
 
 
 
|-
| colspan="8" bgcolor="#E9E9E9"|
|-

2007

 
 
 
 
 
 
 
|-
| colspan="8" bgcolor="#E9E9E9"|
|-

2002

 
 
 
 
 
 
|-
| colspan="8" bgcolor="#E9E9E9"|
|-

1997

 
 
 
 
 
 
 
|-
| colspan="8" bgcolor="#E9E9E9"|
|-

References

4